Velvet Cacoon was a black metal band from Portland, Oregon, United States. According to members, the band was formed in 1996, although no material was released publicly until 2002. Due to the lack of information being provided by its members, it has proved very difficult to discern what is truth and what is fiction about Velvet Cacoon.

As of December 2009, Velvet Cacoon have broken up. However, Josh has posted on several forums that he has begun a new project entitled Clair Cassis. Clair Cassis released their album on vinyl LP record via Full Moon Productions in 2010, and two EPs releases through Khrysanthoney Co.

Discography

Studio releases

 Dextronaut - (2002)
 Music For Falling Buildings - (2002)
 Chapelflames (Red Steeples) - (2003)
 Genevieve - (2004) Full Moon Productions
 Northsuite - (2005) Full Moon Productions
 Dextronaut (Remastered) - (2006) Full Moon Productions
 Atropine - (2009) Full Moon Productions
 P aa opal Poere Pr. 33 - (2009) Starlight Temple Society

External links
 Official Website (Internet Archive)|
 Fan website containing all interviews and history of the band
 First interview with Josh
 First interview with Angela
 Interview with Josh and Angela
 A new interview with Josh
 Official Starlight Temple Society Website (offline)
 Official Full Moon Productions Website
 Official Full Moon Productions Website

Notes

American black metal musical groups
Heavy metal musical groups from Oregon
Dark ambient music groups
Musical groups established in 2001
Musical hoaxes
1996 establishments in Oregon
2009 disestablishments in Oregon
Musical groups disestablished in 2009